Charles Hall (1690–1743) ), of Kettlethorpe, Lincolnshire, was a British Tory politician who sat in the House of Commons from 1727 to 1734.

Hall was baptized on 6 May 1690, the only son of Thomas Hall of Kettlethorpe and his wife  Amy Mildmay, daughter of Henry Mildmay of Graces, Essex. She was previously married to Vincent Amcotts of Harrington, Lincolnshire. He succeeded his father in 1698 and, after he came of age,  built the present house at Kettlethorpe Hall in the early 1700s.

Hall  was returned in a contest  as a Tory Member of Parliament for Lincoln at the  1727 British general election. He voted consistently against the Administration. He did not stand in the  1734 British general election but supported his kinsman, Coningsby Sibthorp instead.

Hall died   unmarried on  21 August 1743, leaving all his Lincolnshire estates to his nephew Charles Amcotts.

References

1690 births
1743 deaths
Members of the Parliament of Great Britain for English constituencies
British MPs 1727–1734